Catchplay (stylized as CATCHPLAY) is a Taiwanese multimedia company founded in 2007, whose businesses include OTT VOD streaming service operation, linear television channel operation (CatchPlay Movie Channel) and theatrical film distribution. Legally, it operates as a Taiwan branch of CatchPlay, Inc., a company registered in Cayman Islands.

Recent years have seen the brand extend into more diverse aspects of the movie entertainment industry. Since making its first production investment in 2014 – co-financing the Taiwanese film Paradise in Service – Catchplay has expanded its investments to include three New Regency films, most notably The Revenant and Assassin’s Creed in 2016–17. In 2015, Catchplay began partnering with local telecom providers across Southeast Asia to launch Catchplay On Demand, a premium movie on-demand service.

Origins 
Originally established in 2005 in Fremont, CA, by Timothy Chen, VIA OnDemand announced its digital download offering during Computex in Taipei, Taiwan, in 2006[1] and later rebranded as Catchplay. In 2008, Catchplay announced intentions to expand into the theatrical distribution business and relocated its headquarters to Taiwan.

VIA OnDemand started as part of the parent VIA Group before rebranding as Catchplay under founder and World Economic Forum Young Global Leader Timothy Chen and prominent shareholder Cher Wang, co-founder of HTC and integrated chipset maker VIA Technologies. Harvey Chang, previously Chief Executive Officer of Taiwan Mobile and an award-winning business leader in the finance and telecom sectors in Taiwan, joined Catchplay in 2012 as Chairman of Catchplay Media Holding Company. In the same year, Daphne Yang joined Catchplay as Executive Director and Group CEO following an early career an advertising and nearly 8 years as Vice President of Marketing at Taiwan Mobile.

Theatrical and DVD Distribution 
In 2008, Catchplay theatrical distribution business was relocated to Taiwan. After starting with a distribution run of 12 titles in 2008 – including Rambo and Righteous Kill –  business has grown steadily and now averages more than 30 titles distributed theatrically each year. Over the same period, Catchplay became the largest independent distributor of DVD rights, claiming nearly 2,200 licensed titles to date.

Feature Film Production 
Extending the brand's commitment of being ‘For Movie Lovers, By Movie Lovers’, Catchplay made its first feature film production investment by co-financing the Taiwanese film Paradise in Service, which premiered as the opening film at the 2014 Busan International Film Festival. That same year, Catchplay co-produced 20 Once Again with CJ Entertainment and the film went on to gross $380M RMB at the box office in China.

In early 2015, Catchplay established a partnership to invest in three New Regency titles – The Revenant, Assassin’s Creed and Splinter Cell – marking the first investment by a Taiwanese company in major Hollywood productions. Catchplay and its partners will exclusively distribute the films in China, Hong Kong, Macau and Taiwan. Additionally, Catchplay supported shooting for and invested in the production of Martin Scorsese’s passion project, Silence, which was shot entirely in Taiwan.

In July 2020, Catchplay announcing the partnerships with Taiwan Creative Content Agency (TAICCA) to form the joint venture SCREENWORKS ASIA to support the developments of Taiwanese films and TV series. The company first project was the second season of The Making of An Ordinary Woman, along with crime drama Trinity of Shadows (co-produced with Hongkong ViuTV and jointly distributed with HBO Asia) and their first ever unscripted talk show Dee's Talk. Catchplay has previously co-distribute The World Between Us with HBO Asia and even carried the first season of The Making of An Ordinary Woman as well.

Movie Channels and Content Aggregation 
Capitalizing on the digitalization of Taiwan's pay TV systems, Catchplay HD Movie Channel was launched in early 2013. Today the service has approximately one million subscribers and is rated as one of the most popular digital movie channels in Taiwan.

In addition to its own movie channel, Catchplay supplies content for various Video on Demand services in Taiwan, including Chunghwa Telecom, Taiwan Mobile’s MyVideo service, and FarEastone’s Friday Video in addition to the VOD services provided by pay TV operators in Taiwan. In Singapore, Catchplay's on demand service provides content from Hollywood Studios and independent licensors for StarHub customers through StarHub TV and StarHub Go and all other Singapore consumers via the Catchplay On Demand app and www.catchplay.com.

Partnerships 
In Taiwan, Catchplay partners with Taiwan Mobile and FarEasTone to offer OTT services for mobile paid streaming. Chunghwa Telecom (IPTV) and CNS (Cable TV) are Catchplay's major content aggregation partners. Sony Taiwan is the first smart TV preload partner for Catchplay.

In Singapore, Catchplay operates both a TVOD service, Catchplay On Demand, and an SVOD service, Catchplay Unlimited, on StarHub TV and StarHub Go. Catchplay Unlimited is a subscription-based movie channel while Catchplay On Demand premieres current blockbuster Hollywood Studio and independent movies just a few months after theatrical debut.

In Indonesia, Catchplay On Demand premiered exclusively for IndiHome (Telkom Indonesia) subscribers in June 2016 on IndiHome's hybrid (IPTV & OTT) set top boxes in addition to web and mobile app service, marking the first seamless triple-play VOD service in the Indonesian market. While the service has also opened up for other partners and directly to all consumers in Indonesia, the brands continue to work closely together.

Movies On Demand (MOD) 
Catchplay On Demand, a premium VOD service began rolling out to markets in Southeast Asia in 2016. After an initial launch in Taiwan in March, service soon expanded to Singapore and Indonesia. Catchplay works closely with telecom providers in each market to provide fully integrated OTT services.

In addition to its long-established strength in acquiring independent films and local content for each market, Catchplay has multi-territory studio agreements that allow the service to feature the latest cinematic releases as soon as they become available. Studio digital partnerships include NBCUniversal, Warner Bros., Disney and Paramount.

Most recently, Catchplay On Demand has been rebranded as Catchplay+, to include not just movies but also TV series and Anime as well. It even became official OTT broadcasters for 73rd Primetime Emmy Awards in Taiwan & Indonesia, the event was aired simultaneously with the US broadcast and was available to be streamed on demand immediately after.

References

External links
 Catchplay.com

2007 establishments in Taiwan
Mass media companies established in 2007
Companies based in Taipei
Film distributors